Justus Liebigs Annalen der Chemie (often cited as just Liebigs Annalen) was one of the oldest and historically most important journals in the field of organic chemistry worldwide. It was established in 1832 and edited by Justus von Liebig with Friedrich Wöhler and others until Liebig's death in 1873. 

In 1997 the journal merged with Recueil des Travaux Chimiques des Pays-Bas to form Liebigs Annalen/Recueil. In 1998 it was absorbed by European Journal of Organic Chemistry by merger of a number of other national European chemistry journals.

Title history 
 Annalen der Pharmacie, 1832–1839
 Annalen der Chemie und Pharmacie, 1840–1873 (CODEN JLACBF)
 Justus Liebig's Annalen der Chemie und Pharmacie, 1873–1874 (CODEN JLACBF)
 Justus Liebig's Annalen der Chemie, 1874–1944 & 1947–1978 (CODEN JLACBF)
 Liebigs Annalen der Chemie, 1979–1994 (CODEN LACHDL)
 Liebigs Annalen, 1995–1996 (CODEN LANAEM)
 Liebigs Annalen/Recueil, 1997 (CODEN LIARFV)
 European Journal of Organic Chemistry, 1998+ (Print ; e, CODEN EJOCFK)

External links 
  of European Journal of Organic Chemistry (the successor journal of Liebigs Annalen, including a complete archive of the latter)
 Liebigs Annalen at the Internet Archive
 Justus Liebigs Annalen der Chemie at the Hathi Trust

Chemistry journals
Publications established in 1832
Wiley-VCH academic journals
Publications disestablished in 1997
Justus von Liebig
Defunct journals